First Daughter is a 1999 American action thriller television film directed by Armand Mastroianni and written by Chad Hayes and Carey W. Hayes. It stars Mariel Hemingway as a United States Secret Service agent who must rescue the daughter of the President from domestic terrorists. Gregory Harrison, Doug Savant, and Diamond Dallas Page also star, with Monica Keena playing the title character. It aired on TBS on August 15, 1999. 

The film was followed by two sequels, First Target (2000) and First Shot (2002).

Plot
A domestic terrorist group make an unsuccessful attempt on the life of US President Jonathan Hayes and the group's leader, Michael Smith, is subsequently captured. Some members of the group manage to evade capture and continue with terrorist activities. Eight weeks later, believing the threat is past, the President organizes an outdoors activity trip for his teenage daughter, Jess, who has grown tired of the public life and constant Secret Service supervision. Jess, excited about the trip, is disappointed to learn a Secret Service agent she dislikes, Alex McGregor, will be accompanying her, despising her over a misunderstanding embrace between her father and Alex. Jess goes so far as to spread rumors about Alex during the trip, leaving an air of animosity between the two of them.

Unbeknownst to the hikers, during their trip they are seen by members of the domestic terrorist group who have been hiding out in the same woods to evade capture. The terrorists initially believe they are witnessing a normal group of hikers, but soon notice bodyguards with guns. Eventually, one of the group recognizes Jess, and identifies her as the daughter of President Hayes. They quickly form a plan to kidnap Jess in order to negotiate the release of Smith. They ambush the hikers, kill one of the bodyguards, and kidnap Jess.

With the help of one of the river guides, Grant Coleman, Alex searches for Jess and attempts a daring rescue.

Cast
 Mariel Hemingway as Secret Service Agent Alex McGregor
 Monica Keena as First Daughter Jessica "Jess" Hayes
 Doug Savant as Grant Coleman
 Dallas Page as Dirk Lindman
 Alan Dale as Secret Service Director Daly
 Dominic Purcell as Troy Nelson
 Gregory Harrison as President Jonathan Jesse Hayes
 David Wheeler as Michael Smith
 Chris Sadrinna as Eric Nelson

External links
 

1990s American films
1990s English-language films
1999 television films
1999 films
1999 action thriller films
Action television films
American action thriller films
American thriller television films
Films about fictional presidents of the United States
Films about kidnapping in the United States
Films about terrorism in the United States
Films about the United States Secret Service
Films directed by Armand Mastroianni
Films scored by Louis Febre
TBS original films